Matthew is an English language male given name. It ultimately derives from the Hebrew name "" (Matityahu) which means "Gift of Yahweh".

Etymology

The Hebrew name "" (Matityahu) was transliterated into Greek to "Ματταθίας" (Mattathias). It was subsequently shortened to Greek "Ματθαῖος" (Matthaios); this was Latinised as Matthaeus, which became Matthew in English. The popularity of the name is due to Matthew the Apostle who, in Christian tradition, is one of the twelve apostles of Jesus and the author of the Gospel of Matthew.

Maiú and Maidiú were both a borrowing of the name Matthew among the Anglo-Normans settlers in Ireland. Maitiú is the most common Irish form of the name. Matthew is also used as an anglicisation of the Irish name Mathúin (meaning "bear").

Popularity
The name Matthew became popular during the Middle Ages in Northwest Europe, and has been very common throughout the English-speaking world.

In Ireland, Matthew was ranked the 15th most popular male name in 2007. In 2008, it was ranked 20th, falling to 23rd between 2009-2010, and then 24th between 2011-2012. In 2016, it was the 29th most popular male name in Ireland, rising to 26th in 2017.

In the United Kingdom, Matthew has been among the 10 most popular male names. Matthew has been in the top 1,000 most popular male names in Australia, Canada and United States.

List of people

See also 

Maciej
Madis
Mads
Maitiú
Máté
Matei
Matej
Mateja
Mateo
Mateu
Mateus
Mateusz
Matevž
Matha
Matheus
Mathias
Mathieu
Mathis
Matias
Matías
Matija
Matīss
Matko
Matouš
Matúš
Mats
Matt
Matteo
Matthaeus
Matthaios
Matthieu
Matti
Mattia
Mattias
Mattis
Matty
Matvei (Matfei)
Mátyás

References 

English-language masculine given names
Hebrew-language given names
Irish masculine given names
English masculine given names